A list of windmills and windmill sites which lie in the current ceremonial county of Norfolk. This list covers those windmills that had a function other than drainage. Drainage mills are covered by the List of drainage windmills in Norfolk. Mills used for drainage and another function appear on both lists.

Locations

A

B

C

D

E

F

G

H

I

K

L

M

N

Norwich 

Windmills within a 5-mile (8 km) radius of Norwich Castle.

O

P

R

S 
{| class="wikitable"
|-
! Location
! Name of mill andgrid reference
! Type
! Maps
! First mentionor built
! Last mention or demise
! Photograph
|-
| Saham Toney
| Saham Toney Mill
| Tower
|
| 1826
| Norfolk Mills
|
|-
| Saham Toney
| 
| Post
| 1797
| 1797
| 1797
|
|-
| Saham Toney
| Saham Hills Mill
| Post
|
| 1884
| 1884
|
|-
| Saham Toney
| Ashley's Mill
| Tower
| 1797
| 1797
| 1797
|
|-
| Saham Toney
| 
| Post
| 1797
| 1797
| 1797
|
|-
| Salters Lode
|
| Smock
| 18241826
| 1824
| 1949Norfolk Mills
|
|-
| Salhouse
| 
| Post
| 18261838
| 1826
| 1873Norfolk Mills
|
|-
| Salhouse
| 
| Tower
|
| 1852
| 1901Norfolk Mills
|
|-
| Salthouse
|
|
|
| 1649
| 1649Norfolk Mills
|
|-
| Salthouse
|
| Smock
| 1826
| 1825
| 1890Norfolk Mills
|
|-
| Salthouse
| 
| Tower
|
| 1841
| Destroyed by artillery 1915Norfolk Mills
|
|-
| Saxlingham Thorpe
| 
|
|
| 1792
| 1804Norfolk Mills
|
|-
| Saxlingham Thorpe
| 
| Tower
|
| 1838
| Demolished c. 1885Norfolk Mills
|
|-
| Scole
| Scole Mill
| Tower
| 1826
| 1799
| 1908, truncated by 1926Norfolk Mills
|
|-
| Scottow
|
|
|
| 1282
| 1282Norfolk Mills
|
|-
| Scottow
|
|
|
| 1614
| 1655Norfolk Mills
|
|-
| Scottow
| Mill Common Mill
| Post
| 179718261838
| 1755
| Demolished June 1875Norfolk Mills
|
|-
| Scoulton
| 
|
|
| 1282
| 1282Norfolk Mills
|
|-
| Scoulton
|
|Tower
|
| 
| 
| 
|-
| Sculthorpe
| Sculthorpe Mill
| Tower
| 1838
| 1836
| c. 1900Norfolk Mills
|
|-
| Sea Palling
|
|
|
| 12th century
| 12th centuryNorfolk Mills
|
|-
| Sea Palling
|
|
|
| 1692
| 1692Norfolk Mills
|
|-
| Sea Palling
| Sea Palling Mill
| Tower
| 18261838
| 1792
| Norfolk Mills
| 
|-
| Sedgeford
| 
|
|
|
| Norfolk Mills
|
|-
| Sedgeford
| 
| Tower
| 18241826
| 1824
| Demolished 1949Norfolk Mills
|
|-
| Sheringham
|
|
|
| 1573
| 1590Noroflk Mills
|
|-
| Sheringham
| 
| Tower
| 1838
| 1836
| 1865Norfolk Mills
|
|-
| Shipdham
| Market Street Mill
|
| 1797
| 1797
| 1891Norfolk Mills
|
|-
| Shipdham
| Mill Road Mill
|
| 179718181826
| 1797
| 1904Norfolk Mills
|
|-
| Shipdham
| West End Mill
| Post
| 17971826
| 1797
| 1891Norfolk Mills
|
|-
| Shropham
|
| Smock
|
| 1835
| 1911Norfolk Mills
|
|-
| Shouldham
| Fincham Mill
| Post
| 17491765177517971826
| 1749
| Demolished 1827Norfolk Mills
|
|-
| Shouldham
| Shouldham Mill
| Tower
|
| 1827
| 1896Norfolk Mills
|
|-
| Shouldham
| Shouldham Mill
|
| 1797
| 1797
| 1810Norfolk Mills
|
|-
| Shouldham Thorpe
| Fodderston Mill
|
| 1826
| 1826
| Demolished c. 1830Norfolk Mills
| 
|-
| Shouldham Thorpe
| Fodderston Mill
| Tower
|
| 1830
| Norfolk Mills
| 
|-
| Sidestrand
| Black Mill
| Smock
|
| 1864
| Collapsed 1921Norfolk Mills
|
|-
| Smallburgh
| Wayford Bridge MillDilham Dyke Mill
| Tower
|
| 1847
| Norfolk Mills
| 
|-
| South Creake
| Beck Street Mill
| Post
| 17971824
| 1778
| Demolished c. 1866Norfolk Mills
|
|-
| South Creake
| Common Mill
|
| 17491765177517971824
| 1706
| 1824Norfolk Mills
|
|-
| South Creake
| Compton Hall Mill
|
|
| 1844
| 1844Norfolk Mills
|
|-
| South Creake
|
|
|
| 1253
| 1253Norfolk Mills
|
|-
| Southery
|
| Post
|
| 1900
| 1900
|
|-
| South Lopham
| 
|
| 179718261834
| 1797
| Demolished c. 1905Norfolk Mills
|
|-
| South Lopham
| Gaol House Mill
| Tower
| 1837
| 1830
| Demolished c. 1925Norfolk Mills
|
|-
| South Runcton
|
|
|
| 1302
| 1302Norfolk Mills
|
|-
| Southtown
| High Mill
| Tower<ref name=Flint> </ref>
|
| 1812| Demolished 1905Norfolk Mills
|
|-
| Southtown
| Green Cap Mill
| Tower
|
| c. 1815
| Burnt down 1898
|
|-
| Southtown
| Water's mill
| Post
| 1783
| 1783
| Moved to Southwold 1798
|
|-
| Southtown
| Halfway House Mill
| Tower
| 1764
| 1764
| 1764
|
|-
| Southtown
| Church Road Mill
| Tower
| 1826*
| 1826
| 1826
|
|-
| Southtown
| Cliff Mill
| Tower
| 1837
| 1837
| Demolished 1887
|
|-
| South Walsham
| South Walsham Mill| Post
|
| 2000| Norfolk Mills
| 
|-
| Sporle
| 
| Tower
|
| 1836
| 1881Norfolk Mills
|
|-
| Stalham
| Cooke's Mill
| Smock
|
| 1797| Burnt down 6 January 1903Norfolk Mills
|
|-
| Stalham
| Staithe Mill
| Tower
|
| 1836
| 1926Norfolk Mills
| 
|-
| Stanhoe
|
| Post
|
|
| Norfolk Mills
|
|-
| Stiffkey
| 
|
| 1826
| 1826
| 1826Norfolk Mills
|
|-
| Stiffkey
| 
| Tower
|
| 1836| 1893, gone by 1934Norfolk Mills
|
|-
| Stoke Ferry
| Stoke Ferry Mill
|
| 1824
| 1824
| Demolished 1860s
|
|-
| Stoke Ferry
| Stoke Ferry Mill| Tower
|
| 1860s
| Norfolk Mills
| 
|-
| Stoke Ferry
| 
| Post
|
| 1758
| 1861
|
|-
| Stokesby
| Stokesby Mill Trett's Mill| Tower
|
| 1826| Norfolk Mills
| 
|-
| Stow Bedon
|
| Smock
|
| 1875
| 1875Norfolk Mills
|
|-
| Stratton St Mary
| Rayner's Mill
| Smock
|
| 1854
| 1887Norfolk Mills
|
|-
| Stratton St Michael
| Mill Farm Mill
| Post
| 167517971826
| 1675
| 1826Norfolk Mills
|
|-
| Stratton St Michael
| 
| Post
| 18261838
| 1826
| 1870Norfolk Mills
|
|-
| Stratton St Michael
| Leeder's MillLong Stratton Mills| Tower
| 1826
| 1826
| Norfolk Mills
| 
|-
| Strumpshaw
|
| Smock
| 1749
| 1749
| c. 1915Norfolk Mills
|
|-
| Sutton
| 
| Tower
| 1797
| 1762
| Burnt down 1861
|
|-
| Sutton
| Sutton Mill| Tower
|
| 1861| Norfolk Mills
| 
|-
| Sutton
| 
|
| 1826
| 1826
| 1826Norfolk Mills
|
|-
| Swaffham
| North Pool Mill
| Smock
|
| 1836
| 1895Norfolk Mills
|
|-
| Swaffham
| Kidallsmill Farm
| Post
| 167517971824182618321834
| 1675
| Demolished 1881Norfolk Mills
|
|-
| Swanton Abbot
| 
|
|
|
| Norfolk Mills
|
|-
| Swanton Abbot
| 
| Tower
|
| c. 1845
| 1926Norfolk Mills
|
|-
| Swanton Morley
| 
| Post
| 1797
| 1795
| Demolished 1906Norfolk Mills
|
|}

 T 

 U 

 W 

 Y 

 Maps 
 1675 Ogilvy
 1736 John Kirby
 1749 Emanuel Bowen
 1765 Corbridge
 1775 Bowles
 1783 Hodskinson
 1797 Faden
 1824 Ordnance Survey
 1826 Bryant
 1826*Bryant
 1834 Greenwood
 1837 Ordnance Survey
 1838 Ordnance Survey

 Notes 

Mills in bold are still standing, known building dates are indicated in bold. Text in italics denotes indicates that the information is not confirmed, but is likely to be the case stated.

Mills in locations that were absorbed from Suffolk in 1974 are listed under the List of windmills in Suffolk.

 Sources 

Unless indicated otherwise, the source for all entries is the individual pages linked to the Norfolk Mills website and/or '''. Where information given on the Norfolk Mills entry is not readily verifiable on that page, it has been checked as correct by reference to Apling's book.

References 

 
Norfolk
Windmills